Zhang Chao (born 5 January 1985) is a male Chinese international table tennis player.

He won the gold medal at the 2011 World Table Tennis Championships – Mixed Doubles with Cao Zhen and the bronze medal at the 2009 World Table Tennis Championships – Mixed Doubles with Yao Yan.

See also
 List of table tennis players
 List of World Table Tennis Championships medalists

References

Table tennis players from Anshan
Living people
1985 births
Chinese male table tennis players
World Table Tennis Championships medalists